Hildreth is both a surname and a given name. Notable people with the name include:

Surname:
 Ellen Hildreth, co-inventor of the Marr–Hildreth algorithm in machine vision.
 Horace A. Hildreth, governor of Maine, 1945–1949
 James Hildreth, cricketer
 Lee Hildreth, footballer
 Lou Wills Hildreth (born 1928), American Southern gospel performer, songwriter, talent agent and television host
 Mark Hildreth, wrestler, known as Van Hammer
 Mark Hildreth (actor)
 Richard Hildreth, journalist, historian
 Sam Hildreth, racehorse trainer
 Samuel Hildreth (American Revolution) (1750–1823), a surgeon in the Massachusetts militia and aboard Massachusetts naval privateers during the American Revolutionary War
 Samuel Prescott Hildreth (1783–1863), a pioneer physician, scientist, and historian in Ohio and the Northwest Territory
 Wes Hildreth, or E. W. Hildreth, a notable USGS geologist

Given name:
 Hildreth Frost, Colorado National Guardsman and lawyer
 Hildreth Glyn-Jones (1895–1980), British barrister
 Hildreth Meière, artist